The Alfred E. Smith  Building, known officially as the Alfred E. Smith State Office Building and sometimes called simply the Smith Building, is a structure located in downtown Albany, New York across the street from the New York State Capitol and One Commerce Plaza. The building's namesake, Alfred Emmanuel Smith, was a four-term governor of New York and the Democratic Party's nomination for the 1928 presidential election. The Art Deco skyscraper has 34 stories and at 388 feet (118 m) is Albany's second tallest structure (after the Erastus Corning Tower). Completed in 1928, it houses offices of the New York State government. An extensive renovation of the building began in 2002. This modernization, which cost at least $103 million, is now finished.

Prior to reconstruction, the building was home to the state Comptroller's Office.  With the renovation complete, the new tenants include the New York State Department of Civil Service, Department of State, New York State Banking Department, New York State Liquor Authority, and Division of the Budget.

The Alfred E. Smith Building has several distinctive features. These include the engraving of the names of all 62 New York State counties around the street-level facade and an Art Deco lobby with a mural depicting famous New Yorkers. A tunnel connects the building to the Capitol. The skyscraper is constructed of limestone and granite, and has views of Albany and the nearby landscape.

Gallery

See also
List of tallest buildings in Albany, New York

References
Notes

Sources
Alfred E. Smith State Office Building at Emporis Buildings
"Modernizing a landmark is a taxing task: Smith building renovation requires an eye for detail along with lots of cash." Elizabeth Benjamin. Times Union. November 6, 2005.
"DeWolff website"

External links

Buildings and structures in Albany, New York
Skyscrapers in Albany, New York
Government buildings completed in 1928
Art Deco skyscrapers
Art Deco architecture in New York (state)
1928 establishments in New York (state)
Skyscraper office buildings in New York (state)